Whakatāne is the seat of the Bay of Plenty Region in the North Island of New Zealand,  east of Tauranga and  north-east of Rotorua, at the mouth of the Whakatāne River. Whakatāne District is the encompassing territorial authority, which covers an area to the south and west of the town, excluding the enclave of Kawerau District.

Another  people live in the rest of the Whakatāne District. Around 42% of the population identify as having Māori ancestry and 66% as having European/Pākehā ancestry, compared with 17% and 72% nationally (some people identify with multiple ethnicities).

Whakatāne forms part of the parliamentary electorate of East Coast, currently represented by Kiri Allan of the New Zealand Labour Party. The town is the main urban centre of the eastern Bay of Plenty sub-region, which incorporates Whakatāne, Kawerau, and Ōpōtiki, and stretches from Otamarakau in the west, to Cape Runaway in the north-east and Whirinaki in the south. Whakatāne is the seat of the Bay of Plenty Regional Council, chosen as a compromise between the region's two larger cities, Tauranga and Rotorua.

History and culture

Māori occupation
The site of the town has long been populated. Māori pā (Māori fortified village) sites in the area date back to the first Polynesian settlements, estimated to have been around 1200 CE. According to Māori tradition Toi-te-huatahi, later known as Toi-kai-rakau, landed at Whakatāne about 1150 CE in search of his grandson Whatonga. Failing to find Whatonga, he settled in the locality and built a pa on the highest point of the headland now called Whakatāne Heads, overlooking the present town. Some 200 years later the Mātaatua waka landed at Whakatāne.

The Maori name  is reputed to commemorate an incident occurring after the arrival of the Mataatua. The men had gone ashore and the canoe began to drift. Wairaka, a chieftainess, said "Kia whakatāne au i ahau" ("I will act like a man"), and commenced to paddle – something that women were not allowed to do. With the help of the other women, the canoe was saved. Wairaka's efforts are commemorated by a bronze statue of her at the mouth of the Whakatāne River, which was installed in 1965.

The region around Whakatāne was important during the New Zealand Wars of the mid-19th century, particularly the Völkner incident. Its role culminated in 1869 with raids by Te Kooti's forces and a number of its few buildings were razed, leading to an armed constabulary being stationed above the town for a short while. Whakatāne beach heralded a historic meeting on 23 March 1908 between Prime Minister Joseph Ward and the Māori prophet and activist Rua Kenana Hepetipa. Kenana claimed to be Te Kooti's successor.

European settlement

The town was a notable shipbuilding and trade centre from 1880 and with the draining of the Rangitāiki swamp into productive farmland from 1904, Whakatāne grew considerably. In the early 1920s, it was the fastest-growing town in the country for a period of about three years and this saw the introduction of electricity for the first time. The carton board mill at Whakatāne began as a small operation in 1939 and continues operating to this day.

The Whakatāne River once had a much longer and more circuitous route along the western edge of the Whakatāne urban area, having been significantly re-coursed in the 1960s with a couple of its loopier loops removed to help prevent flooding and provide for expansion of the town. Remnants of the original watercourse remain as Lake Sullivan and the Awatapu lagoon. The original wide-span ferro-concrete bridge constructed in 1911 at the (aptly named) Bridge Street was demolished in 1984 and replaced by the Landing Road bridge.

Whakatāne has in recent years benefited from its relative dominance over numerous smaller and less prosperous towns surrounding it, such as Te Teko (affectionately known as 'Texas') and Waimana, and its popularity as a retirement and lifestyle destination.

Mataatua Declaration
The 'First International Conference on the Cultural and Intellectual Property Rights of Indigenous Peoples' was held in Whakatāne from 12 to 18 June 1993. This resulted in the Mataatua Declaration on Cultural and Intellectual Property Rights of Indigenous Peoples', commonly referred to as the Mataatua Declaration.

Marae

Whakatāne has five marae, which are meeting places for Ngāti Awa hapū:
 Te Hokowhitu a Tū ki te Rāhui Marae and Te Hokowhitu a Tūmatauenga meeting house is affiliated with Ngāti Wharepaia and Ngāti Hokopū – Te Hokowhitu a Tu Ki Te Rāhui.
 Te Rangihouhiri II Marae and Te Rangihouhiri II meeting house is affiliated with Ngāi Te Rangihouhiri II.
 Tokitareke or Warahoe Marae and Te Puna o Te Orohi meeting house is affiliated with Warahoe.
 Toroa or Pupuaruhe Marae and Toroa meeting house is affiliated with Te Patuwai.
 Te Whare o Toroa Marae and Wairaka meeting house is affiliated with Ngāti Wharepaia and Ngāti Hokopū – Te Whare o Toroa.

In October 2020, the Government committed from the Provincial Growth Fund to upgrading Te Hokowhitu a Tū ki te Rāhui Marae and 11 other Ngāti Awa marae, creating 23 jobs. It also committed $282,275 to upgrade Te Whare o Toroa Marae, creating an estimated 21 jobs.

Demographics

Whakatāne had a population of 15,795 at the 2018 New Zealand census, an increase of 1,410 people (9.8%) since the 2013 census, and an increase of 1,098 people (7.5%) since the 2006 census. There were 5,820 households, comprising 7,491 males and 8,307 females, giving a sex ratio of 0.9 males per female, with 3,402 people (21.5%) aged under 15 years, 2,670 (16.9%) aged 15 to 29, 6,546 (41.4%) aged 30 to 64, and 3,180 (20.1%) aged 65 or older.

Ethnicities were 66.6% European/Pākehā, 42.4% Māori, 3.5% Pacific peoples, 4.9% Asian, and 1.3% other ethnicities. People may identify with more than one ethnicity.

The percentage of people born overseas was 14.5, compared with 27.1% nationally.

Although some people chose not to answer the census's question about religious affiliation, 47.8% had no religion, 35.9% were Christian, 6.5% had Māori religious beliefs, 0.7% were Hindu, 0.1% were Muslim, 0.5% were Buddhist and 1.3% had other religions.

Of those at least 15 years old, 1,812 (14.6%) people had a bachelor's or higher degree, and 2,667 (21.5%) people had no formal qualifications. 1,593 people (12.9%) earned over $70,000 compared to 17.2% nationally. The employment status of those at least 15 was that 5,310 (42.8%) people were employed full-time, 1,953 (15.8%) were part-time, and 639 (5.2%) were unemployed.

Geography

The island has numerous sites of pā. It also provided shelter for James Cook's Endeavour in 1769. A whaling station existed on the island during the 19th century.

Whakaari/White Island is an active marine volcano located 48 kilometres (25 n.mi.) offshore of Whakatāne and a popular visitor attraction. Sulphur mining on the island was attempted but abandoned in 1914 after a lahar killed all 10 workers.

The mouth of the Whakatāne River and Ohiwa Harbour have both provided berths for yachts, fishing trawlers and small ships since European settlement of the area. Nearby Ōhope Beach is a sandy beach stretching  from the Ohiwa Harbour entrance.

Climate

Whakatāne has frequently recorded the highest annual sunshine hours in New Zealand (year and respective sunshine hours shown below). Since official recording began in 2008, the town has frequently attained upwards of 2600 hours a year. The town recorded an average of over 7.5hrs of sunshine a day in 2013. Whakatāne also records the national daily high (temp) on approximately 55 days of the year.

Natural disasters
Whakatāne was affected by the 1987 Edgecumbe earthquake. Heavy rain struck the Bay of Plenty region between 16 and 18 July 2004, resulting in severe flooding and a state of civil emergency being declared. Many homes and properties were flooded, forcing thousands of Whakatāne residents to evacuate. The Rangitaiki River burst its banks, flooding large areas of farmland, and numerous roads were closed by floods and slips. A total of 245.8 mm (9") of rain fell in Whakatāne in the 48-hour period and many small earthquakes were also felt during this time, loosening the sodden earth and resulting in landslips that claimed two lives. 

Whakatane is also the closest town to Whakaari / White Island, which experienced a fatal eruption in 2019. The town was heavily affected by the disaster in which 22 lost their lives.

Industries and tourism
 
The town's main industries are diverse: forestry, tourism, agriculture, horticulture, fishing and manufacturing are all well-established. There is a large carton board packaging mill, a newspaper press, and a brewery.

While farming and forestry activities remain the dominant sectors, tourism is a growing industry for Whakatāne, with a continued increase in guest nights in the district. White Island is a key attraction. Popular tourist activities include the beaches, swimming with dolphins, whale watching, chartered fishing cruises, surf tours, amateur astronomy, hunting, experiences of Maori culture and bush walking. Whakatāne is also used as a base for many tourists who wish to explore other activities in the surrounding region.

Aquaculture is an emerging industry for the Eastern Bay, with the development of a 3800 hectare (15 sq. mi.) marine farm 8.5 km (4 n.mi.) offshore of Ōpōtiki, expected to produce 20,000 tonnes of mussels per annum by 2025 and add $35 million to regional GDP. Whakatāne is home to the regional radio station One Double X – 1XX – one of the first privately owned commercial radio stations on air in New Zealand in the early 1970s.

Whakatāne has become the dominant commercial service centre for the Eastern Bay. In 2006, a large-format shopping centre (The Hub Whakatane) was built on the edge of town anchored by national chains Bunnings Warehouse and Harvey Norman. Its retail space totals 24,000sqm (6 acres) and includes 900 car parks. Prior to the centre's construction, it was estimated around $30 million in local retail spending was being lost to large format retail stores in neighboring Tauranga and Rotorua.

Whakatāne Museum, a local museum operating across two premises with changing exhibitions, opened in 1972.

Infrastructure 

Whakatane Airport is served by Air Chathams with direct flights to Auckland using Fairchild Swearingen Metroliner aircraft. Air New Zealand previously operated the Auckland service until April 2015.
Private cars, limited public transport and taxis (as well as cycling and walking) are the primary modes of transport for residents.

Whakatāne sits at the eastern end of State Highway 30. State Highway 2 bypasses the urban area.

Bus 
Baybus runs between Whakatāne and Ōhope. Furthermore, once-daily return bus services operate to Tauranga, en route from Kawerau and Ōpōtiki on alternate weekdays. Bee cards were introduced for fares on 27 July 2020.

Marine

Coastal trading, including scows and steamships – notably the Northern Steamship Company service, which ran until 1959, used Whakatāne as a port of call. Today it primarily services charter vessels, commercial & recreational fishing vessels. The depth of water over the Whakatāne River entrance has been a limiting factor to the development of better port facilities, but it is generally held that a training wall along the western edge of the entrance would allow greater depths and safer crossings.

Rail
A passenger train called the Taneatua Express ran on the East Coast Main Trunk Railway (ECMT) as far as Taneatua until 1959. The Taneatua Branch line was formerly part of the ECMT and connected with the current ECMT at Hawkens Junction.

A private railway line operated by Whakatane Board Mills (now Carter Holt Harvey Whakatāne) formerly connected the company's mill on the western side of the river to the Taneatua Branch line at Awakeri.  The Whakatane Board Mills Line was freight only, with no passenger service. In 1999 operation of the Whakatane Board Mills line was taken over by Tranz Rail (now KiwiRail) and the line was renamed the Whakatane Industrial line. The line has since been closed and lifted, and the Taneatua Branch line is used for tourist excursions.

Education

Two tertiary institutes, Te Whare Wānanga o Awanuiārangi and Toi Ohomai Institute of Technology, have campuses in Whakatāne.

Notable people

 Lisa Carrington, New Zealand flatwater canoer
 Lindy Chamberlain, New Zealand-Australian woman wrongly convicted in one of Australia's most publicised murder trials
 Maurice Gee, New Zealand author
 Joe Harawira, environmental campaigner
 Patrick Herbert, New Zealand rugby league player
 Francis Kora, Māori musician and actor
 Margaret Mahy, New Zealand author
 Benji Marshall, New Zealand rugby league and rugby union player
 Mike Moore, New Zealand politician and Prime Minister
 Albert Oliphant Stewart (1884–1958), tribal leader and local politician
 Rex Patrick, Australian politician
 Alexander Peebles (1856–1934), first chairman of the Whakatāne County Council in 1900
 Eve Rimmer, New Zealand paraplegic athlete
 Ian Shearer, New Zealand politician
 Sarah Walker, New Zealand BMX racer

References

External links
 Whakatane.info
 Whakatāne Information Centre

 
Whakatane District
Populated places in the Bay of Plenty Region
Territorial authorities of New Zealand
Surfing locations in New Zealand